The Soliz-Baca House is a historic house in Dwyer, New Mexico. It was built with adobe for Alvino Soliz, and purchased by Ed Baca in 1935. Baca rebuilt a room. The house was designed in the New Mexico Vernacular architectural style. It has been listed on the National Register of Historic Places since June 17, 1988.

References

Adobe buildings and structures in New Mexico
Houses on the National Register of Historic Places in New Mexico
National Register of Historic Places in Grant County, New Mexico